Chrysoprasis moerens is a species of beetle in the family Cerambycidae. It was described by White in 1853.

References

Chrysoprasis
Beetles described in 1853